David Jack (born January 20, 1960 in Bristol, Pennsylvania) is an American children's performer, composer, pianist and tap dancer.

Biography
Jack is a Parents' Choice Award-winning composer and performer of children's music. He has appeared on television and radio, including NBC's The Today Show, and he frequently entertains at children's music festivals throughout the United States. 

He is best known for his eleven years of daily performances at Sesame Place, during which he performed live on stage with Elmo and other Sesame Street characters. 

In addition to his career as a children's performer, he is well known in the Philadelphia area as a stage actor. He is a member of the Screen Actors Guild as well as Actors' Equity Association. 
  
Jack is also the founder of SchoolAssemblies Brands, a company based in Perkasie, Pennsylvania that provides curriculum-based school assembly programs to elementary schools across the country.

References

1960 births
Male actors from Philadelphia
American children's musicians
Living people
Musicians from Philadelphia